Daniel O. Jones (born September 26, 1969) is an American serial killer who raped and stabbed four young women to death in Kansas City, Missouri, between 1998 and 2001. He was arrested shortly after the final murder, and DNA evidence linked him to the previous crimes, after which he confessed and was given multiple life sentences.

Early life 
Daniel O. Jones was born on September 26, 1969. A native of Kansas City, Jones attended Raytown South High School in Raytown, Missouri. As a student, he was known to be disruptive in class, was often seen wandering the hallway unattended, and was frequently in trouble. On May 20, 1987, Jones attacked a female teacher, dragged her from her classroom into the school's auditorium where he raped her, and threatened to kill her. After about 15 minutes, the teacher was able to escape. He was arrested three days later when the victim identified him from the school yearbook. Jones pleaded innocent in his arraignment when he was indicted on one count of forcible rape.

In 1988, Jones was found guilty and was sentenced to 10 years in prison. In 1989, he attempted to appeal his sentence on the grounds that prosecutors should not have been allowed to bring up Jones' behavior in school, however, the appeal was rejected. In 1996, Jones was paroled after serving eight years of his sentence.

Murders 
On December 2, 1998, Jones broke into the apartment of 19-year-old Jenai Douglas, whom he had known since his adolescence. Jones attacked and stabbed Douglas repeatedly until her death. After the killing, Jones left the apartment without stealing anything. Later that same day, Douglas' roommate returned home and found her body. According to Douglas' mother Kim, Jones would stop by her house on multiple occasions to offer condolences after Jenai's murder. 

On March 10, 1999, Jones broke into apartment of 21-year-old Kaliquah Gilliam. Jones brandished a knife and attacked Gilliam, stabbing her a total of 36 times before stopping, presumably after realizing she was dead, and fleeing the area. On August 16, 1999, Jones smashed the back patio window to enter the apartment of 21-year old Roxanne Colley. Jones had known Colley as the two had become acquainted with one another and had sex with each other, even though Colley had a boyfriend. Once again, Jones brandished a knife and attacked Colley, raping her, then stabbing her repeatedly before slashing her throat, ultimately killing her.

In February 2000, shortly after the first anniversary of Jenai Douglas' murder, a reward of $3,000 was offered for information leading to finding her killer. Kim Douglas had added an extra $2,000 to the standard $1,000 in hopes of a bigger chance in solving the case. On March 6, 2001, Jones broke into an apartment at the Linden Hill apartment complex, owned by 18-year-old Candriea White, a young mother of two. Jones attacked her with a knife in the kitchen, stabbing and slashing her 14 times. After White was dead, Jones left the house, having not harmed her infant children who had watched the ordeal.

Arrest and trial 
On March 8, Jones was arrested based upon his palm print and fingerprints matching the ones the killer left behind at the house. While behind bars, a sample of his DNA was collected by investigators who matched the sample to semen evidence left behind at Roxanne Colley's murder. Jones appointed Horton Lance to defend him during his trial. In his trial, Lance brought up that Jones had an alibi the day of the murder, as his family members testified that he was with them that afternoon. Lance also cast doubt on the fingerprinting evidence that was used to charge Jones, saying that the prosecutors lacked witnesses, a confession, and a motive. On August 21, 2002, the jury found Jones guilty of White's murder, subsequently imposing the sentence of life imprisonment without parole.

When re-looking at older cases, investigators noted how similar the killings of Douglas and Gilliam were to Jones' modus operandi. Jones' DNA was also taken and compared to the murders of Douglas and Gilliam, but the samples were not enough to identify him as the killer. In 2004, Jones confessed to killing Douglas and Gilliam and offered to plead guilty to all charges. Gilliam's grandmother said that, while she was frustrated with Jones, she did not want him to be sentenced to death because, according to her, he was just a young man.

See also 
 List of serial killers in the United States

External links 
 Missouri Department of Corrections inmate information

References 

1969 births
1998 murders in the United States
1999 murders in the United States
2001 murders in the United States
20th-century American criminals
21st-century American criminals
American male criminals
American people convicted of murder
American prisoners sentenced to life imprisonment
American rapists
American serial killers
Crime in Kansas City, Missouri
Crimes in Missouri
Deaths by stabbing in the United States
Living people
Male serial killers
People convicted of murder by Missouri
Prisoners sentenced to life imprisonment by Missouri
Violence against women in the United States